Amele Adefemi Olubunmi D. (b. 14 November), more popularly known as Femi D, is a Nigerian Radio and TV broadcaster, talk show host, web series producer, and political journalist. Frequent topics of discussion on his shows include national policy development, macro-economics, governance, and international affairs. In 2020, he was listed in the top 100 media personalities of the year by YNaija.

Biography

Amele was born 14 November 1983 in Nigeria and developed an interest in broadcasting at 14. He worked as a backup host for Nnamdi Azikiwe University's UNIZIK FM radio station on a show called International Affairs. His first talk show debuted in 2010 at a radio station in Awka and focused on both national and international politics through his own commentary and listener calls. The same year, he was awarded a UK grant to produce a documentary about climate change's effect on Lagos; his film was later nominated for the Climate Change TV Award. In 2011, he joined Cool FM Nigeria and the now-defunct magazine 234Next. While at Cool FM, he helped establish and develop Nigeria Info, now a network of talk radio stations. Amele has worked at 101.9 Jay FM, Nigeria Info, Amplified Radio, and GAlpha Media in a variety of positions, from programme director to board chairman. He has hosted regular shows such as Morning Crossfire with FemiDlive (2019, Nigeria Info and Let's Talk with Femi D (95.1 Abuja) as well as specials such as Ready to Run Radio ahead of the 2019 election. Amele is also a founder of music and talk show app VibingLive; an advisory board member for the iRead Nigeria Project; and has interviewed people such as Jerry Gana, Lai Mohammed, Audu Maikori, and 2Baba. During his career, he has written for Opera News Hub, which is an online money making platform for writers in Nigeria. He has also written forMbele, Legit.ng, and Vanguard and produced a number of documentaries, including Anything For Us about government bribery and corruption in Nigeria (with the support of YIAGA Africa and the MacArthur Foundation and High and Dry about drug abuse. Also a winner of Nigeria Health Watch and recipients of the 2nd #PreventEpidemicsNaija Journalism Fellowship.

In 2019, he was awarded an honourary doctorate from Youth Education and Leadership Initiative in Conflict Management and Development, and holds a certificate from the International Business Management Institute in Strategic Management; a certificate in global diplomacy from University of London; and a certificate in operation management strategy from the Metropolitan School Of Business Management in the UK. In 2020, he was named a Fellow by Nigeria Health Watch. He resides in Lagos.

Election activism
Amele is an active member of the #NotTooYoungToRun movement, which advocates for a bill to lower the age eligibility requirements for Nigerian elected officials. He wrote and narrated the documentary Young Lawmakers Credit 'Not Too Young To Run' Law For Their Emergence in collaboration with YIAGA Africa; made Facing Vote Buying in Elections ahead of the 2019 election; and made How Young People Fared in Contesting in 2019 Elections, which aired on Channels TV. With the support of YIAGA Africa and the European Union, he co-hosted Ready to Run Radio on Nigeria Info, also before the 2019 election. He has also done voiceover work for the Independent National Electoral Commission.

Recognition
 Winner, Basic Education Media Fellowship 2022
 Finalist, Sports Presenter of the Year (Nigeria Radio Awards, 2011)
 Winner, Personality of the Year (Bayero University, 2012)
 Nominee, Presenter of the Year (Sports Writers Association of Nigeria, 2014)
 Winner, Best Director (HD Film Academy Script to Screen Awards, 2014)
 Winner, Beacon of Literacy Award (iRead Nigeria Project, 2015)
 Winner, Economic Power Award (2015)
 Winner, National Dream Personality Award (Ministry Of Youth and Sports and Nigeria Rebirth, 2016)
 Winner, Best On-Air Personality (Nigeria Broadcasters Merit Award, 2016) 
 Finalist, Best On-Air Personality (Who Is Who Awards, 2017)
 Ambassador for Change and Advocacy of Human Rights (Enhancing Communities Action for Peace and Better Health, 2018)
 Honourable World Class Change Ambassador for Peace and Humanity
 Honourary member and ambassador of Youth Education and Leadership Initiative

References

External links

Living people
Nigerian journalists
Nigerian radio presenters
1983 births